Jean-Baptiste Leclerc (10 March 1920 – 3 March 2001) was a French wrestler. He competed at the 1948 Summer Olympics and the 1952 Summer Olympics.

References

1920 births
2001 deaths
French male sport wrestlers
Olympic wrestlers of France
Wrestlers at the 1948 Summer Olympics
Wrestlers at the 1952 Summer Olympics
Sportspeople from Vosges (department)